Dąbkowice may refer to the following places:
Dąbkowice, Greater Poland Voivodeship (west-central Poland)
Dąbkowice, Łódź Voivodeship (central Poland)
Dąbkowice, West Pomeranian Voivodeship (north-west Poland)